Acarbose (INN) is an anti-diabetic drug used to treat diabetes mellitus type 2 and, in some countries, prediabetes. It is a generic sold in Europe and China as Glucobay (Bayer AG), in North America as Precose (Bayer Pharmaceuticals), and in Canada as Prandase (Bayer AG). It is cheap and popular in China, but not in the U.S. One physician explains the use in the U.S. is limited because it is not potent enough to justify the side effects of diarrhea and flatulence. However, a recent large study concludes "acarbose is effective, safe and well tolerated in a large cohort of Asian patients with type 2 diabetes." A possible explanation for the differing opinions is an observation that acarbose is significantly more effective in patients eating a relatively high carbohydrate Eastern diet.

Acarbose is a starch blocker, and inhibits alpha glucosidase, an intestinal enzyme that releases glucose from larger carbohydrates. It is composed of an acarviosin moiety with a maltose at the reducing terminus. Acarbose is also degraded to maltose and acarviosin by the glucosidase cyclomaltodextrinase from gut bacteria Lactobacillus plantarum.

Natural distribution
In nature, acarbose is synthesized by soil bacteria Actinoplanes sp through its precursor valienamine. And acarbose is also degraded by gut bacteria Lactobacillus plantarum and soil bacteria Thermus sp by acarbose degrading glucosidases.

Mechanism of action
Acarbose inhibits enzymes (glycoside hydrolases) needed to digest carbohydrates, specifically, alpha-glucosidase enzymes in the brush border of the small intestines, and pancreatic alpha-amylase. It locks up the enzymes by mimicking the transition state of the substrate with its amine linkage. However, bacterial alpha-amylases from gut microbiome are able to degrade acarbose.

Pancreatic alpha-amylase hydrolyzes complex starches to oligosaccharides in the lumen of the small intestine, whereas the membrane-bound intestinal alpha-glucosidases hydrolyze oligosaccharides, trisaccharides, and disaccharides to glucose and other monosaccharides in the small intestine. Inhibition of these enzyme systems reduces the rate of digestion of complex carbohydrates. Less glucose is absorbed because the carbohydrates are not broken down into glucose molecules. In diabetic patients, the short-term effect of these drug therapies is to decrease current blood glucose levels; the long-term effect is a reduction in HbA1c level. This reduction averages an absolute decrease of 0.7%, which is a decrease of about 10% in typical HbA1c values in diabetes studies.

Combination therapy
The combination of acarbose with metformin results in greater reductions of HbA1c, fasting blood glucose and post-prandial glucose than either agent alone.

Dosing
Since acarbose prevents the digestion of complex carbohydrates, the drug should be taken at the start of main meals (taken with first bite of meal). Moreover, the amount of complex carbohydrates in the meal will determine the effectiveness of acarbose in decreasing postprandial hyperglycemia.  Adults may take doses of 25 mg 3 times daily, increasing to 100 mg 3 times a day. However the maximum dose per day is 600 mg.

Side-effects
Since acarbose prevents the degradation of complex carbohydrates into glucose, some carbohydrate will remain in the intestine and be delivered to the colon.  In the colon, bacteria digest the complex carbohydrates, causing gastrointestinal side-effects such as flatulence (78% of patients) and diarrhea (14% of patients). Since these effects are dose-related, in general it is advised to start with a low dose and gradually increase the dose to the desired amount. One study found that gastrointestinal side effects decreased significantly (from 50% to 15%) over 24 weeks, even on constant dosing.

If a patient using acarbose has a bout of hypoglycemia, the patient must eat something containing monosaccharides, such as glucose tablets or gel (GlucoBurst, Insta-Glucose, Glutose, Level One) and a doctor should be called. Because acarbose blocks the breakdown of table sugar and other complex sugars, fruit juice or starchy foods will not effectively reverse a hypoglycemic episode in a patient taking acarbose.

Hepatitis has been reported with acarbose use.  It usually goes away when the medicine is stopped. Therefore, liver enzymes should be checked before and during use of this medicine.

Life extension 
In studies conducted by three independent laboratories by the US National Institute on Aging's intervention testing programme, acarbose was shown to extend the lifespan of female mice by 5% and of male mice by 22%.

Metabolism 
Acarbose degradation is the unique feature of glycoside hydrolases in gut microbiota, acarbose degrading glucosidase, which hydrolyze acarbose into an acarviosine-glucose and glucose. Human enzymes do transform acarbose: the pancreatic alpha-amylase is able to perform a rearrangement reaction, moving the glucose unit in the "tail" maltose to the "head" of the molecule. Analog drugs with the "tail" glucose removed or flipped to an α(1-6) linkage resist this transformation.

It has been reported that the maltogenic alpha-amylase from Thermus sp. IM6501 (ThMA) and a cyclodextrinase (CDase) from Streptococcus pyogenes could hydrolyse acarbose to glucose and acarviosine-glucose, ThMA can further hydrolyze acarviosine-glucose into acarviosin and glucose. A cyclomaltodextrinase (CDase) from gut bacteria Lactobacillus plantarum degraded acarbose via two different modes of action to produce maltose and acarviosin, as well as glucose and acarviosine-glucose, suggest that acarbose resistance  is caused by in the human microbiome. The microbiome-derived acarbose kinases are also specific to phosphorylate and inactivate  acarbose. The molecular modeling showed the interaction between gut bacterial acarbose degrading glucosidase and human α-amylase.

In molecular biology 
Acarbose is described chemically as a pseudotetrasaccharide, specifically a maltotetraose mimic inhibitor. As an inhibitor that mimics some natural substrates, it is useful for elucidating the structure of sugar-digesting enzymes, by binding into the same pocket.

References

External links 
 
 "Probing the Pancreas" - by Craig D. Reid, Ph.D. (US FDA Consumer Article)

Alpha-glucosidase inhibitors
Amino sugars
Bayer brands
Oligosaccharides
Cyclohexenes